Nauplius is a peer-reviewed open access scientific journal in the field of carcinology (crustacean research). It is published by the Brazilian Crustacean Society (Sociedade Brasileira de Carcinologia). The editor-in-chief is Christopher Tudge (American University).

Abstracting and indexing
The journal is abstracted and indexed in:
Aquatic Sciences and Fisheries Abstracts
Current Contents/Agriculture, Biology & Environmental Sciences
Science Citation Index Expanded
The Zoological Record
According to the Journal Citation Reports, the journal has a 2020 impact factor of 0.610.

References

External links

Carcinology journals
Publications established in 1993
English-language journals
Creative Commons Attribution-licensed journals